Antony John (Tony) Chapman is a British psychologist and university administrator.

Career
Chapman was awarded a PhD by the University of Leicester. He was then appointed as a lecturer at the University of Wales Institute of Science and Technology. In 1983 he moved to the University of Leeds as Professor of Psychology and Head of Department where he was promoted to Dean of Science and Pro-Vice-Chancellor.

In 1998, he was appointed Vice-Chancellor of the University of Wales Institute, Cardiff. He has been editor of the British Journal of Psychology and editor-in-chief/editor of Current Psychology.

Awards
 Honorary Fellow British Psychological Society 
 Academician/Fellow Academy of Social Sciences
 Hon DSc, University of Leicester

Positions

 President, Psychology Section of the British Association for the Advancement of Science
 President, British Psychological Society
 President, Academy of Social Sciences

References

Fellows of the Academy of Social Sciences
Alumni of the University of Leicester
British psychologists
Fellows of the British Psychological Society